Kinka Beneva Racheva (born May 28, 1973 in Ruse) is a Bulgarian sprint canoer who competed in the early 1990s. She was eliminated in the semifinals of the K-4 500 m event at the 1992 Summer Olympics in Barcelona.

References
 Sports-Reference.com profile

1973 births
Bulgarian female canoeists
Canoeists at the 1992 Summer Olympics
Living people
Olympic canoeists of Bulgaria
Sportspeople from Ruse, Bulgaria